Owensville Historic District is a national historic district at Owensville, Anne Arundel County, Maryland.  It is located around a small crossroads community located at the intersection of Owensville Road (MD 255) and Owensville-Sudley Road.  It consists of a concentration of historic buildings leading up to and clustered around the intersecting roads. It consists of 27 buildings, including two church complexes, 16 dwellings with their associated domestic outbuildings, and several agricultural buildings, including tobacco barns. Included in the district is the separately listed Christ Church. Much of the historic building stock dates between 1825 and 1875.

It was listed on the National Register of Historic Places in 2003.

References

External links
, including photo from 2002, at Maryland Historical Trust
Boundary Map of the Owensville Historic District, Anne Arundel County, at Maryland Historical Trust

Historic districts on the National Register of Historic Places in Maryland
Historic districts in Anne Arundel County, Maryland
National Register of Historic Places in Anne Arundel County, Maryland